Intendant may refer to: 

 Theater manager, the administrator and often also artistic director of a theater 
 Opera manager, the administrator and often also artistic director of an opera house 
 Public officials especially in non-English-speaking countries called "intendants" in English 
 (In German) director general, managing director, and artistic director of a public broadcasting company, concert hall, orchestra, festival, or similar cultural institution